Ikehata is a Japanese surname that may refer to
Hiroshi Ikehata (池畑, born 1970), Japanese weightlifter
Kanae Ikehata (池端, born 1982), Japanese foil fencer
Shinnosuke Ikehata (池畑, born 1952), Japanese comedienne, singer, dancer and actor 
Seiichi Ikehata (池端, 1929–2007), Japanese politician 
Yōsuke Ikehata (池端, born 1979), Japanese football player 

Japanese-language surnames